Rafael Nieto Navia (born 5 February 1938) is a Colombian jurist, political scientist and professor.

He was President of the Inter-American Court of Human Rights between 1993-1994. Furthermore he has served as Judge of the International Criminal Tribunal for the former Yugoslavia and he has served as Ambassador of Colombia to Sweden with dual accreditation to Denmark, Finland and Iceland.

Legal career
Nieto has served as Judge of the International Criminal Tribunal for the former Yugoslavia for more than five years. Four of them as a member of the Appeals Chamber and the International Criminal Tribunal for Rwanda, and more than one year as a member of the Trial Chambers. He served as Judge of the Inter-American Court of Human Rights for twelve years, and he was President of the same for three and a half years. He also served as Auxiliary Magistrate of the Constitutional Chamber of the Supreme Court of Colombia for four years.

Ambassadorship
On 7 January 2009 Chancellor Jaime Bermúdez Merizalde announced that Nieto had been appointed Ambassador to Sweden by President Álvaro Uribe Vélez, stating that Nieto was a "super internationalist, very well respected, and with a lot of tradition" . Chancellor Bermúdez sworn him in the next month on 10 February as Ambassador Extraordinary and Plenipotentiary of the Republic of Colombia to the Kingdom of Sweden serving concurrently as Non-Resident Ambassador to the Kingdom of Denmark, the Republic of Finland, and the Republic of Iceland. Nieto moved to Stockholm shortly after to take up his office, officially presenting his Letters of Credence to His Majesty Carl XVI Gustaf King of Sweden on 13 May 2009; as Non-Resident Ambassador, he presented his credentials to the President of Iceland Ólafur Ragnar Grímsson on 9 February 2010, and to Her Majesty Margrethe II Queen of Denmark on 15 February 2010.

Personal life
Nieto was born on 5 February 1938 in Bogotá, D.C. to Eduardo Nieto Umaña (22 November 1904 - 14 January 1946) and Teresa Navia Harker (22 August 1904 - 27 April 1991). He married María Teresa Loaiza Cubides on 28 August 1965. They have four children: Rafael, Juan Carlos, Pablo, and María Teresa.

References

1938 births
Living people
People from Bogotá
Pontifical Xavierian University alumni
Academic staff of the Pontifical Xavierian University
20th-century Colombian judges
21st-century Colombian judges
International Criminal Tribunal for Rwanda judges
International Criminal Tribunal for the former Yugoslavia judges
Ambassadors of Colombia to Denmark
Ambassadors of Colombia to Finland
Ambassadors of Colombia to Iceland
Ambassadors of Colombia to Sweden
Inter-American Court of Human Rights judges
Colombian judges of United Nations courts and tribunals
Colombian judges of international courts and tribunals